This is a list of species within the braconid wasp genus Cotesia.

Cotesia species

A
 Cotesia abdinbekovae Papp, 2009
 Cotesia abjecta (Marshall, 1885)
 Cotesia acaudus (Provancher, 1886)
 Cotesia acerbiae Shaw & Vikberg, 2015
 Cotesia acronyctae (Riley, 1870)
 Cotesia acuminata (Reinhard, 1880)
 Cotesia acutula (Tobias, 1973)
 Cotesia adippevora Shaw, 2009
 Cotesia affinis (Nees, 1834)
 Cotesia agricola (Viereck, 1917)
 Cotesia algonquinorum (Viereck, 1917)
 Cotesia alia (Muesebeck, 1958)
 Cotesia alternicolor (You & Zhou, 1988)
 Cotesia alypiae (Muesebeck, 1922)
 Cotesia americana (Lepeletier, 1825)
 Cotesia amesis (Nixon, 1974)
 Cotesia ammalonis (Muesebeck, 1926)
 Cotesia amphipyrae (Watanabe, 1934)
 Cotesia analis (Nees, 1834)
 Cotesia ancilla (Nixon, 1974)
 Cotesia anisotae (Muesebeck, 1921)
 Cotesia anomidis (Watanabe, 1942)
 Cotesia anthelae (Wilkinson, 1928)
 Cotesia aphae (Watanabe, 1934)
 Cotesia arctica (Thomson, 1895)
 Cotesia argynnidis (Riley, 1889)
 Cotesia asavari (Sathe, 1989)
 Cotesia astrarches (Marshall, 1889)
 Cotesia atalantae (Packard, 1881)
 Cotesia aururus (Telenga, 1955)
 Cotesia australiensis (Ashmead, 1900)
 Cotesia autographae (Muesebeck, 1921)
 Cotesia autumnatae Shaw, 2013
 Cotesia ayerzai (Brèthes, 1920)

B
 Cotesia bactriana (Telenga, 1955)
 Cotesia balli Oltra & Michelena, 1989
 Cotesia bambeytripla (Shenefelt, 1972)
 Cotesia berberidis (Rudow, 1910)
 Cotesia berberis (Nixon, 1974)
 Cotesia bhairavi (Sathe & Inamdar, 1991)
 Cotesia biezankoi (Blanchard, 1960)
 Cotesia bifida (Sharma, 1973)
 Cotesia bignellii (Marshall, 1885)
 Cotesia bonariensis (Brèthes, 1916)
 Cotesia bosei (Bhatnagar, 1950)
 Cotesia brachycera (Thomson, 1895)
 Cotesia brevicornis (Wesmael, 1837)

C
 Cotesia cajae (Bouché, 1834)
 Cotesia caligophagus (Blanchard, 1964)
 Cotesia callimone (Nixon, 1974)
 Cotesia calodetta (Nixon, 1974)
 Cotesia capucinae (Fischer, 1961)
 Cotesia carduicola (Packard, 1881)
 Cotesia cerurae (Muesebeck, 1926)
 Cotesia charadrae (Muesebeck, 1921)
 Cotesia chares (Nixon, 1965)
 Cotesia cheesmanae (Wilkinson, 1928)
 Cotesia chiloluteelli (You, Xiong & Wang, 1985)
 Cotesia chiloniponellae (You & Wang, 1990)
 Cotesia chilonis (Munakata, 1912)
 Cotesia chinensis (Wilkinson, 1930)
 Cotesia chrysippi (Viereck, 1911)
 Cotesia cingiliae (Muesebeck, 1931)
 Cotesia cirphicola (Bhatnagar, 1950)
 Cotesia cleora (Nixon, 1974)
 Cotesia clepta (Tobias, 1986)
 Cotesia clethrogynae Long, 2014
 Cotesia clisiocampae (Ashmead, 1903)
 Cotesia compressithorax  (Hedqvist, 1965)
 Cotesia congestiformis (Viereck, 1923)
 Cotesia congregata (Say, 1836)
 Cotesia corylicolus (Tobias, 1986)
 Cotesia coryphe (Nixon, 1974)
 Cotesia crambi (Weed, 1887)
 Cotesia crassifemorata van Achterberg, 2006
 Cotesia cultellata (Tobias, 1966)
 Cotesia cuprea (Lyle, 1925)
 Cotesia cyaniridis (Riley, 1889)
 Cotesia cynthiae (Nixon, 1974)

D
 Cotesia danaisae (Hedqvist, 1965)
 Cotesia decaryi (Granger, 1949)
 Cotesia deliadis (Bingham, 1906)
 Cotesia delicata (Howard, 1897)
 Cotesia delphinensis (Granger, 1949)
 Cotesia depressa (Viereck, 1912)
 Cotesia depressithorax (Tobias, 1964)
 Cotesia diacrisiae (Gahan, 1917)
 Cotesia dictyoplocae (Watanabe, 1940)
 Cotesia disparis (Tobias, 1986)
 Cotesia diurnii Rao & Nikam, 1984
 Cotesia diversa (Muesebeck & Walkely, 1951)

E
 Cotesia effrena (Wilkinson, 1928)
 Cotesia elaeodes (de Saeger, 1944)
 Cotesia electrae (Viereck, 1912)
 Cotesia eliniae Papp, 1989
 Cotesia elongata Zargar & Gupta, 2019
 Cotesia empretiae (Viereck, 1913)
 Cotesia endii (Sathe & Ingawale, 1995)
 Cotesia enypiae (Mason, 1959)
 Cotesia erionotae (Wilkinson, 1928)
 Cotesia errator (Nixon, 1974)
 Cotesia euchaetis (Ashmead, 1898)
 Cotesia eulipis (Nixon, 1974)
 Cotesia eunomiae Shaw, 2009
 Cotesia euphobetri (Blanchard, 1935)
 Cotesia euphydryidis (Muesebeck, 1921)
 Cotesia euprocti Sathe, 2005
 Cotesia euryale (Nixon, 1974)
 Cotesia euthaliae (Bhatnagar, 1950)
 Cotesia evagata (Papp, 1973)
 Cotesia exelastisae (Bhatnagar, 1950)

F
 Cotesia fascifemorata van Achterberg, 2006
 Cotesia ferruginea (Marshall, 1885)
 Cotesia fiskei (Viereck, 1910)
 Cotesia flagellator (Wilkinson, 1930)
 Cotesia flagitata (Papp, 1971)
 Cotesia flaviconchae (Riley, 1881)
 Cotesia flavicornis (Riley, 1889)
 Cotesia flavipes Cameron, 1891
 Cotesia fluvialis (Balevski, 1980)

G
 Cotesia gabera Papp, 1990
 Cotesia gades (Nixon, 1974)
 Cotesia gastropachae (Bouché, 1834)
 Cotesia geometricae Austin, 2000
 Cotesia geryonis (Marshall, 1885)
 Cotesia gillettei (Baker, 1895)
 Cotesia glabrata (Telenga, 1955)
 Cotesia glomerata (Linnaeus, 1758)
 Cotesia gonopterygis (Marshall, 1898)
 Cotesia gordii (Muesebeck, 1926)
 Cotesia gramini Sathe & Rokade, 2005
 Cotesia gregalis Yang & Wei, 2002
 Cotesia griffini (Viereck, 1911)

H
 Cotesia hadenae (Muesebeck, 1926)
 Cotesia halisidotae (Muesebeck, 1931)
 Cotesia hallii (Packard, 1877)
 Cotesia hanshouensis (You & Xiong, 1983)
 Cotesia harteni Papp, 2003
 Cotesia hemileucae (Riley, 1881)
 Cotesia hesperidivora (Viereck, 1912)
 Cotesia hiberniae (Kurdjumov, 1912)
 Cotesia hispanica (Oltra & Falco, 1996)
 Cotesia honora Papp, 1990
 Cotesia hyperion (de Saeger, 1944)
 Cotesia hyphantriae (Riley, 1887)
 Cotesia hypopygialis (Granger, 1949)
 Cotesia hypsipylae (Wilkinson, 1928)

I
 Cotesia icipe Fernandez-Triana & Fiaboe, 2017
 Cotesia indica Sathe & Rokade, 2005
 Cotesia inducta (Papp, 1973)
 Cotesia intermixta (Balevski, 1980)
 Cotesia invirae Salgado-Neto & Whitfield, 2019
 Cotesia ishizawai (Watanabe, 1939)
 Cotesia isolde (Nixon, 1974)
 Cotesia itororensis Sousa-Lopes & Whitfield, 2019

J
 Cotesia jayanagarensis (Bhatnagar, 1950)
 Cotesia jucunda (Marshall, 1885)
 Cotesia judaica (Papp, 1970)
 Cotesia jujubae (Wilkinson, 1929)
 Cotesia juniperatae (Bouché, 1834)
 Cotesia junoniae (Riley, 1889)

K
 Cotesia kamiyai (Watanabe, 1934)
 Cotesia kariyai (Watanabe, 1937)
 Cotesia karviri Sathe & Rokade, 2005
 Cotesia kasparyani (Tobias, 1976)
 Cotesia kazak (Telenga, 1949)
 Cotesia khuzestanensis Zargar & Gupta, 2019
 Cotesia koebelei (Riley, 1889)
 Cotesia kraussi (Muesebeck, 1958)
 Cotesia kurdjumovi (Telenga, 1955)

L
 Cotesia laeviceps (Ashmead, 1890)
 Cotesia langei (Muesebeck, 1938)
 Cotesia lepidopteri Sathe & Rokade, 2005
 Cotesia lesbiae (Blanchard, 1947)
 Cotesia levigaster (Granger, 1949)
 Cotesia limbata (Marshall, 1885)
 Cotesia limenitidis (Riley, 1871)
 Cotesia lineola (Curtis, 1830)
 Cotesia lizeri (Blanchard, 1947)
 Cotesia luminata Chen & Song, 2004
 Cotesia lunata (Packard, 1881)
 Cotesia lyciae (Muesebeck, 1926)
 Cotesia lycophron (Nixon, 1974)

M
 Cotesia mahoniae (Mason, 1975)
 Cotesia malevola (Wilkinson, 1929)
 Cotesia malshri (Sathe & Inamdar, 1991)
 Cotesia marginiventris (Cresson, 1865)
 Cotesia mayaguezensis (Viereck, 1913)
 Cotesia medicaginis (Muesebeck, 1947)
 Cotesia meghrangini Dawale, Bhosale & Sathe, 1993
 Cotesia melanoscelus (Ratzeburg, 1844)
 Cotesia melitaearum (Wilkinson, 1937)
 Cotesia mendicae (Tobias, 1986)
 Cotesia menezesi (de Santis & Redolfi, 1976)
 Cotesia microsomus (Tobias, 1986)
 Cotesia miyoshii (Watanabe, 1932)
 Cotesia murtfeldtae (Ashmead, 1898)
 Cotesia muzaffarensis (Lal, 1939)

N
 Cotesia nemoriae (Ashmead, 1898)
 Cotesia neptisis (Watanabe, 1934)
 Cotesia neustriae (Tobias, 1986)
 Cotesia nigritibialis (Tobias, 1986)
 Cotesia nikami Kurhade & Nikam, 1998
 Cotesia nitens (Muesebeck, 1921)
 Cotesia noctuidiphagus (Muesebeck, 1926)
 Cotesia nonagriae (Olliff, 1893)
 Cotesia nothus (Marshall, 1885)
 Cotesia nuellorum Whitfield, 2018
 Cotesia numen (Nixon, 1974)
 Cotesia nycteus (de Saeger, 1944)

O
 Cotesia obscuricornis (Viereck, 1917)
 Cotesia ocneriae (Ivanov, 1899)
 Cotesia oeceticola (Blanchard, 1935)
 Cotesia ofella (Nixon, 1974)
 Cotesia ogara Papp, 1990
 Cotesia okamotoi (Watanabe, 1921)
 Cotesia olenidis (Muesebeck, 1922)
 Cotesia onaspis (Nixon, 1974)
 Cotesia oppidicola (Granger, 1949)
 Cotesia opsiphanis (Schrottky, 1909)
 Cotesia ordinaria (Ratzeburg, 1844)
 Cotesia orestes (Nixon, 1974)
 Cotesia orientalis Chalikwar & Nikam, 1984
 Cotesia ornatricis (Muesebeck, 1958)
 Cotesia orobenae (Forbes, 1883)

P
 Cotesia pachkuriae (Bhatnagar, 1950)
 Cotesia paludicolae (Cameron, 1909)
 Cotesia paphi (Schrottky, 1902)
 Cotesia pappi Inanç, 2002
 Cotesia parastichtidis (Muesebeck, 1921)
 Cotesia parbhanii (Rao, 1969)
 Cotesia parijati Sathe, 2003
 Cotesia parvicornis (de Saeger, 1944)
 Cotesia peltoneni (Papp, 1987)
 Cotesia philoeampus (Cameron, 1911)
 Cotesia phobetri (Rohwer, 1915)
 Cotesia pholisorae (Riley, 1889)
 Cotesia pieridis (Bouché, 1834)
 Cotesia pilicornis (Thomson, 1895)
 Cotesia pistrinariae (Wilkinson, 1929)
 Cotesia planula Song & Chen, 2004
 Cotesia plathypenae (Muesebeck, 1921)
 Cotesia podunkorum (Viereck, 1912)
 Cotesia praepotens (Haliday, 1834)
 Cotesia pratapae (Ashmead, 1896)
 Cotesia prenidis (Muesebeck, 1921)
 Cotesia progahinga (Hedqvist, 1965)
 Cotesia prozorovi (Telenga, 1955)
 Cotesia pterophoriphaga (Shenefelt, 1972)
 Cotesia pyralidis (Muesebeck, 1921)
 Cotesia pyraustae (Viereck, 1912)
 Cotesia pyrophilae (Muesebeck, 1926)

R
 Cotesia radiantis (Wilkinson, 1929)
 Cotesia radiarytensis (Shenefelt, 1972)
 Cotesia rangii (Bhatnagar, 1950)
 Cotesia risilis (Nixon, 1974)
 Cotesia riverai (Porter, 1916)
 Cotesia rubecula (Marshall, 1885)
 Cotesia rubripes (Haliday, 1834)
 Cotesia ruficoxis (Hedwig, 1962)
 Cotesia ruficrus (Haliday, 1834)
 Cotesia rufiventris (Bingham, 1906)
 Cotesia rufocoxalis (Riley, 1881)
 Cotesia rugosa (Szépligeti, 1914)
 Cotesia ruidus (Wilkinson, 1928)

S
 Cotesia salebrosa (Marshall, 1885)
 Cotesia saltator (Thunberg, 1822)
 Cotesia saltatoria (Balevski, 1980)
 Cotesia sasakii (Watanabe, 1932)
 Cotesia satunini (Tobias, 1986)
 Cotesia scabricula (Reinhard, 1880)
 Cotesia schaeferi (Marsh, 1979)
 Cotesia schaffneri (Muesebeck, 1931)
 Cotesia schini (Muesebeck, 1958)
 Cotesia schizurae (Ashmead, 1898)
 Cotesia scitula (Riley, 1881)
 Cotesia scotti (Valerio & Whitfield, 2009)
 Cotesia selenevora Shaw, 2009
 Cotesia senegalensis (Risbec, 1951)
 Cotesia sericea (Nees, 1834)
 Cotesia sesamiae (Cameron, 1906)
 Cotesia setebis (Nixon, 1974)
 Cotesia seyali (Risbec, 1951)
 Cotesia shemachaensis (Tobias, 1976)
 Cotesia shrii Sathe, Ingawale & Bhosale, 1994
 Cotesia sibyllarum (Wilkinson, 1936)
 Cotesia simurae (You & Zhou, 1989)
 Cotesia smerinthi (Riley, 1881)
 Cotesia sorghiellae (Muesebeck, 1933)
 Cotesia specularis (Szépligeti, 1896)
 Cotesia sphenarchi (Risbec, 1951)
 Cotesia sphingivora (Granger, 1949)
 Cotesia spuria (Wesmael, 1837)
 Cotesia subancilla (Balevski, 1980)
 Cotesia subordinaria (Tobias, 1976)
 Cotesia suvernii Sathe, Ingawale & Bhosale, 1994
 Cotesia suzumei (Watanabe, 1932)

T
 Cotesia taprobanae (Cameron, 1897)
 Cotesia tatehae (Watanabe, 1932)
 Cotesia tegera (Papp, 1977)
 Cotesia teleae (Muesebeck, 1926)
 Cotesia telengai (Tobias, 1972)
 Cotesia tenebrosa (Wesmael, 1837)
 Cotesia testacea Fujie, Shimizu & Fernandez-Triana, 2018
 Cotesia tetrica (Reinhard, 1880)
 Cotesia thapinthotha Papp, 1990
 Cotesia theae (Sonan, 1942)
 Cotesia theclae (Riley, 1881)
 Cotesia tibialis (Curtis, 1830)
 Cotesia tiracolae (Ashmead, 1896)
 Cotesia tmetocerae (Muesebeck, 1921)
 Cotesia trabalae Gupta, 2016
 Cotesia transuta (de Saeger, 1944)
 Cotesia tuita Papp, 2009
 Cotesia turkestanica (Telenga, 1955)
 Cotesia typhae Fernandez-Triana, 2017

U-Z
 Cotesia ukrainica (Tobias, 1986)
 Cotesia unicolor (Curtis, 1835)
 Cotesia urabae Austin & Allen, 1989
 Cotesia vanessae (Reinhard, 1880)
 Cotesia vestalis (Haliday, 1834)  (diamondback moth parasitoid)
 Cotesia villana (Reinhard, 1880)
 Cotesia viridanae (Tobias, 1986)
 Cotesia xavieri Rousse, 2013
 Cotesia xylina (Say, 1836)
 Cotesia yakutatensis (Ashmead, 1902)
 Cotesia zagrosensis Zargar & Gupta, 2019
 Cotesia zygaenarum (Marshall, 1885)

References

Cotesia, List of